Oral mite anaphylaxis (OMA), also known as pancake syndrome, is a disease in which a person gets symptoms after eating food contaminated with particular mites. The disease name comes from reports of people becoming ill after eating pancakes made from contaminated wheat or corn (maize) flour.

Symptoms and signs
The symptoms are allergic symptoms, especially trouble breathing, swelling of the face and throat, runny nose, cough, difficulty swallowing, and wheals. Anaphylaxis can occur during exposure to NSAID drugs or exercise in people exposed to the mites.

Cause 
Dust mites are microscopic arachnids that produce very powerful allergens.  If dust mites get into the food, then anyone eating the food is eating the allergens and may have an allergic reaction against them.  The specific mites suspected as causing the condition are Dermatophagoides pteronyssinus, Blomia tropicalis, and Suidasia pontifica (Suidasia medanensis). The latter two are the most likely to have caused the harmful effects, and they live in tropical and subtropical environments.

Because the condition is triggered by eating pancakes and other cooked food, scientists expect that this means that the allergen can withstand the heat of cooking.

Prevention 
Storing flour at low temperature, such as in a freezer, could prevent contamination or kill existing mites in the flour.

References

Further reading 

 
 
 
 

Food allergies
Acari and humans
Syndromes